This is a list of neighborhoods in Fort Wayne, Indiana. Historically, Fort Wayne's neighborhoods have been divided among four unofficial quadrants: northeast, northwest, southeast, and southwest. Calhoun Street serves as the dividing line between the southwest and southeast, while the Saint Joseph River divides the northwest and northeast quadrants. The Maumee River separates the northeast and southeast, while portions of the Saint Marys River and Chicago, Fort Wayne and Eastern Railroad separate the northwest and southwest quadrants.

Northeast

Northwest

Southeast

Southwest

Notes
A. Waynedale encompasses the smaller neighborhoods of Ardmore Knolls, Avalon Place, Belle Vista, Broadview Terrace, Elmcrest, Elmhurst, Ferndale, Indian Village, Lake Shores, Lakewood Park, Old Trail, Sand Point, Stone Lake, St. Marys–Winchester Road, Vesey, and Winterset.

References

External links
City of Fort Wayne — Neighborhoods

Neighborhoods in Fort Wayne, Indiana
Lists of neighborhoods in U.S. cities